Richard A. Kerr, also known as Dick Kerr, is a science journalist and former staff writer for Science.

Kerr received his BA in chemistry from the College of Wooster in 1968. After working for a year as a research chemist in the Ocean Sciences Division of the Naval Research Laboratory in Washington, DC, he spent three years as an officer on the fleet oiler USS Ponchatoula during the Vietnam War. After leaving the Navy, Kerr earned his PhD in oceanography from the University of Rhode Island, where he also "surreptitiously" took classes in magazine writing and news reporting. In 1977, a week after defending his dissertation, he accepted a job as a geophysics writer for Science; he was soon promoted to senior writer, and began covering Earth and planetary sciences.

Kerr was elected as a Fellow of the Geological Society of America in 1995.

Honors and awards 

 1990 American Meteorological Society Special Award "for the consistently high quality of his articles in Science on developments and issues in the atmospheric sciences."
 1993 Robert G. Cowen Award for Sustained Achievement in Science Journalism from the American Geophysical Union 
 1994 National Association of Geoscience Teachers James Shea Award
 1995 Outstanding Contribution to Public Understanding of Geology Award from the American Geological Institute
 2006 Geological Society of America Public Service Award
 2013 Jonathan Eberhart Planetary Sciences Journalism Award for his article "Peering Inside the Moon to Read Its Earliest History."

References

External links 

 Richard Kerr on Twitter

Science journalists
Living people
Year of birth missing (living people)